Staphylaea limacina, common name slug-like cowry, is a species of sea snail, a cowry, a marine gastropod mollusk in the family Cypraeidae, the cowries.

Description
The shell size varies between 8 mm and 39 mm. This shell is oval, the dorsum surface is usually pale brown or pinkish with whitish spots or small round whitish protuberances and two orange-brown areas at the extremities, while the base is white. In the living cowries the mantle may have a brown, orange or reddish coloration, with paler finger-like projections.

Distribution
This species is distributed in the Southeast Asia, in Australia and in the Indian Ocean along Aldabra, Chagos, the Comores, Kenya, Madagascar, the Mascarene Basin, Mauritius, Mozambique, Réunion, the Seychelles and Tanzania.

Subspecies
 Staphylaea limacina clarissa Lorenz, 1989
 Staphylaea limacina interstincta (Wood, 1828)

References

 Verdcourt, B. (1954). The cowries of the East African Coast (Kenya, Tanganyika, Zanzibar and Pemba). Journal of the East Africa Natural History Society 22(4) 96: 129–144, 17 pls.

External links
 Flmnh
 
 Cypraea.eu

Cypraeidae
Gastropods described in 1810